Hughmilleriidae (the name deriving from the type genus Hughmilleria, which is named in honor of Scottish geologist Hugh Miller) is a family of eurypterids, an extinct group of aquatic arthropods. The hughmilleriids were the most basal members of the superfamily Pterygotioidea, in contrast with the more derived (more "advanced") families Pterygotidae and Slimonidae. Despite their classification as pterygotioids, the hughmilleriids possessed several characteristics shared with other eurypterid groups, such as the lanceolate telson (the most posterior segment of the body).

Hughmilleriids are defined as pterygotioid eurypterids with swimming legs similar to those of the type genus, Hughmilleria (that is, 7th and 8th leg segments narrow and 9th segment very small), and whose second to fifth pair of appendages were spiniferous. Some further diagnostic characters unite the group, such as the slightly enlarged chelicerae (frontal appendages) and the streamlined shape of their bodies. The family contains only two genera, Hughmilleria and Herefordopterus, though other genera have been referred to the family in the past, such as genera now considered part of families such as the Mycteroptidae and the Waeringopteridae.

The hughmilleriids were the most basal group of pterygotioid eurypterids, lacking the derived features that would come to evolve in the Slimonidae and Pterygotidae, such as flattened and expanded telsons (the posteriormost segment of the body, this feature is shared by both derived families) and enlarged cheliceral claws (exclusive to the pterygotids). In spite of the great similarity of both genera, Herefordopterus had derived characteristics that suggest a close relationship with Slimonidae and Pterygotidae, such as the marginal ornamentation of the telson. On the other hand, Hughmilleria had certain resemblance to the basal adelophthalmid Eysyslopterus, sharing a triangular anterior carapace margin, possibly a plesiomorphic (of a common ancestor) trait.

Description

Hughmilleriid eurypterids ranged in size from 6 to 20 centimetres (2 to 8 inches), representing a group of relatively small eurypterids. Hughmilleriids would be dwarfed by some of their more derived (more "advanced") relatives within their superfamily, especially the pterygotids which would surpass lengths of 2 metres and become the largest known arthropods to ever live.

Like all other chelicerates, and other arthropods in general, the hughmilleriid eurypterids possessed segmented bodies and jointed appendages (limbs) covered in a cuticle composed of proteins and chitin. The chelicerate body is divided into two tagmata (sections); the frontal prosoma (head) and posterior opisthosoma (abdomen). The appendages were attached to the prosoma, and were characterized in hughmilleriids as being spiniferous (possessing spines), a feature that distinguishes the group from the pterygotids and the slimonids, both groups possessing non-spiniferous appendages. The telson (the posteriormost segment of the body), which was lanceolate and styliform, is a feature shared with other eurypterid groups, such as the closely related Adelophthalmoidea. Although these telsons were not flattened and expanded as in both derived families, Herefordopterus had a keel and marginal ornamentation, characteristics also noted within Pterygotidae. The lanceolate shape of their telsons suggests they did not use it as a rudder to swim.

The family is characterized by the presence of spines in the second to fifth pair of appendages, swimming legs with the 7th and 8th leg segments narrow, both twice as long as wide, and the 9th segment small, small and streamlined bodies, slightly enlarged chelicerae (frontal appendages) and a marginal rim in the carapace much broader anteriorly than posteriorly.

History of research

The genus Hughmilleria was erected by Clifton J. Sarle in 1903 to contain the species H. socialis, which was recovered for the first time in the Pittsford Shale Member of the Vernon Formation. The generic name derives from Hugh Miller, a Scottish geologist and writer that found fossils of several Silurian eurypterids, such as Hughmilleria itself. Sarle considered Hughmilleria as an intermediate form between Eurypterus and Pterygotus. However, he did not assigned Hughmilleria to any family.

Hughmilleria was first considered as a genus in the Pterygotidae, being one of the initial members of that family alongside Pterygotus, Slimonia and Hastimima upon its creation by John Mason Clarke and Rudolf Ruedemann in 1912. The family Hughmilleriidae was created by Erik N. Kjellesvig-Waering in 1951, who considered the genera Hastimima, Slimonia and Hughmilleria and the new genus Grossopterus sufficiently distinct from Pterygotus to be in a family of their own. Slimonia was considered too distinct from Hughmilleria in 1962, placed by Nestor Ivanovich Novojilov in its own family, the Slimonidae. The other hughmilleriids would also be reclassified, Hastimima representing a mycteroptidae and Grossopterus a waeringopterid.

This left Hughmilleria as the only genus in the family, rendering it monotypic (including only one subordinate taxon). Hughmilleriidae remained monotypic until a species of Hughmilleria, H. banksii, was raised to the level of a separate genus, Herefordopterus, by O. Erik Tetlie in 2006. With two genera of hughmilleriids known, several diagnostic traits of the family could properly be established, such as the presence of spiniferous appendages.

Classification

The Hughmilleriidae are classified as part of the Pterygotioidea superfamily, within the Diploperculata infraorder and Eurypterina suborder. The Hughmilleriidae has sometimes been interpreted as the sister-taxon of the Pterygotidae. Sarle interpreted Hughmilleria in 1903 as an intermediate form between Eurypterus and Pterygotus, being closer to the latter. For this to happen, the loss of spines in Slimonia and the pterygotids would be convergent. The discovery of Ciurcopterus, the most primitive known pterygotid, and studies revealing that Ciurcopterus combines features of Slimonia (the appendages are particularly similar) and of more derived pterygotids, revealed that the Slimonidae was more closely related to the Pterygotidae than the Hughmilleriidae was, establishing Hughmilleriidae as the most basal group of pterygotioid eurypterids. The family has been recovered as paraphyletic in a number of phylogenetic analyses and does thus not form an actually valid scientific grouping. Nevertheless, the family is retained and routinely used by eurypterid researchers.

Within the family, both genera shared several characteristics such as the carapace being much broader anteriorly than posteriorly, appendages II-V being spiniferous (possessing spines), swimming legs similar to those of Hughmilleria itself, the slight enlargement of their chelicerae and their small and streamlined bodies. However, the marginal ornamentation of the telson and the possession of 12-13 gnathobasic (of the gnathobase, a lower appendage used in feeding) teeth in the appendage VI suggests that Herefordopterus was a derived hughmilleriid. In turn, Hughmilleria lacked the marginal ornamentation of the telson and its appendage VI had 18-20 gnathobasic teeth, so it is considered the most basal genus of Pterygotioidea. The triangular anterior carapace margin present in Hughmilleria is shared by the adelophthalmid eurypterid Eysyslopterus, indicating that it might be a plesiomorphic trait (a trait present in a common ancestor).

The cladogram presented below, derived from a 2007 study by researcher O. Erik Tetlie, showcases the interrelationships between the pterygotioid eurypterids.

Paleoecology

The fossils of the hughmilleriids have been found in Silurian deposits ranging from the Llandovery to Ludlow epochs in the United States, China and England. While Hughmilleria lived in brackish and fresh water communities, Herefordopterus was present in a benthic (at the lowest level of water) environment near an intertidal sandy shore and intertidal sandy mudflat environments.

The Silurian deposits of the Pittsford Shale Member in which fossils of Hughmilleria socialis have been found shelter various faunas of eurypterids, including Mixopterus multispinosus, Erettoperus osiliensis, Eurypterus pittsfordensis and Carcinosoma spiniferus, among others. In the other hand, the Late Silurian of Herefordshire, where most of the fossils of Herefordopterus have been discovered, was home to a wide array of different eurypterids, like Erettopterus gigas, Eurypterus cephalaspis, Nanahughmilleria pygmaea, Marsupipterus sculpturatus, Salteropterus abbreviatus and potentially Slimonia (depending on the identity of S. stylops).

See also
 List of eurypterid genera
 Timeline of eurypterid research
 Pterygotidae
 Slimonidae

References

Silurian animals
Pterygotioidea
Prehistoric arthropod families